The Rolling Stones 1973 European Tour was a concert tour of Great Britain and Continental Europe in September and October 1973 by The Rolling Stones.

History
The tour followed the release of the group's album Goats Head Soup on 31 August.  It began at the Stadthalle in Vienna, Austria on 1 September.  It then saw, in large halls to mid-sized arenas, West Germany, England (including four shows at the Empire Pool in London), Scotland, Switzerland, Denmark, Sweden, The Netherlands, and Belgium, finishing on 19 October with the band's fourth entry into and thirteenth show in West Germany, at the Deutschlandhalle in West Berlin, which would turn out to be Mick Taylor's last live performance with the Stones as a member of the band. Altogether 42 shows were played in 22 cities, with two shows in a day a commonplace.

This was the Stones' first trip to Europe since the European Tour 1970, and was part of parallel three-year cycles of touring the United States and Europe.

The shows
Without all the ballyhoo, media attention, and jet set hangers-on of the group's 1972 American Tour, the 1973 European Tour was seen as having less drama — the biggest pending issue was the resolution of Keith Richards and Anita Pallenberg's 25 June drugs and weapons bust, which hung over them until a 24 October £205 fine from the Great Marlborough Street Magistrates Court resolved it — while showcasing consistently good musicianship. Songs like "Brown Sugar" and "Gimme Shelter" were well received and Billy Preston's organ and clavinet added a contemporary and funky edge to the "classic" Stones sound, although the tour's relatively conventional delineation between rhythm (primarily Richards) and lead guitar (primarily Taylor) parts were later criticised by Richards. By the time of the group's following Tour of the Americas '75, Ron Wood would be in the band and Richards' preferred interweaved approach would be restored.

Recordings
No live album was released from the tour, although a recording of the first 17 October show in Brussels was headed towards official release but pulled back for legal reasons. As Brussels Affair (and some other names such as "Bedspring Symphony - A Box Lunch and Meat Whistle"), it has been a popular bootleg in superb stereo sound, and is often considered a 'lost classic' of bigger importance than some of the official Stones' live albums. The album also included recordings from September 9, 1973 (Empire Pool, Wembley, London). These recordings were broadcast on the King Biscuit Flower Hour (KBFH). Another broadcast included three soundboard mono recordings from Newcastle, two from Empire Pool, Wembley and one from Rotterdam. 

In November 2011, the Rolling Stones launched a web enterprise, www.StonesArchive.com and released the second 17 October Brussels show with two tracks from the first Brussels show as Brussels Affair (Live 1973) worldwide as a digital download in FLAC or MP3 format and as a box set.

Personnel

The Rolling Stones
Mick Jagger – lead vocals, harmonica
Keith Richards – rhythm guitar, vocals
Mick Taylor – lead guitar
Bill Wyman – bass guitar
Charlie Watts – drums

Additional musicians
Billy Preston – piano, organ, clavinet, backing vocals
Steve Madaio – trumpet, flugelhorn
Bobby Keys – saxophone (until 30 September 1973)
Trevor Lawrence – saxophone
Manuel Kellough – percussion (some dates)
Marshall Chess – trumpet on "Street Fighting Man" (some dates)

Bobby Keys left the tour after the Frankfurt dates. In his memoir, he states that he left to clean up from drink and drugs to save his life.

Tour support acts
Opening for the tour's shows was Billy Preston and for him, Kracker, the first band ever to be signed to Rolling Stones Records.  Part of the opening show by Preston was released on Preston's 1974 album release Live European Tour, which featured Mick Taylor.

Tour set list
The standard set list for the tour was:

 "Brown Sugar"
 "Gimme Shelter"
 "Happy"
 "Tumbling Dice"
 "Star Star"
 "Dancing with Mr D"
 "Doo Doo Doo Doo Doo (Heartbreaker)" (not on all shows)
 "Angie"
 "You Can't Always Get What You Want"
 "Midnight Rambler"
 "Honky Tonk Women"
 "All Down the Line"
 "Rip This Joint"
 "Jumpin' Jack Flash"
 "Street Fighting Man"

This set list was pretty stable once established, however, during the first few shows Goats Head Soup tracks "100 Years Ago" (Vienna and Mannheim) and "Silver Train" (Vienna, Cologne, London 1st) got a trying out, as did "Bitch" and "Sweet Virginia" in Vienna. All of the pre-Goats selections had been played on the 1972 American Tour as well, and pretty much in this order. Completely absent was anything from before 1968 in the Stones' catalog.  Indeed, on 18 August, before the tour began, Jagger had been quoted, "The only thing I don't really enjoy about playing live is having to perform the old numbers, even though that's what a lotta people wanna hear us do."

Tour dates

References

Further reading
 Carr, Roy.  The Rolling Stones: An Illustrated Record.  Harmony Books, 1976.

External links
 'Rocks Off' page tour setlists

The Rolling Stones concert tours
1973 concert tours
1973 in Europe
Concert tours of Europe